Nareste was an ancient settlement on the territory of the Illyrian Delmatae. The contemporary location is probably the village of Jesenice, near Omiš, in Croatia.

See also 
List of settlements in Illyria

References 

Former populated places in the Balkans
Cities in ancient Illyria
Illyrian Croatia